Peter William Brockbanks (15 July 1947 – 7 March 2013), known professionally as Peter Banks, was a British guitarist, vocalist, songwriter and producer. He was the original guitarist in the rock band Yes, and also the Syn, Flash, and Empire. Former Sniffin' Glue and NME journalist Danny Baker described Banks as "the architect of progressive music".

Biography

Early life
Banks' father was an optical mechanic and his mother a cleaner. He grew up in Barnet, North London, where he attended Barnet Secondary School and Barnet College of Further Education. When he was a young boy, his father bought him an acoustic guitar. As a teenager, he also learned how to play the banjo.

Early career
Banks started with the Nighthawks in 1963, and played his first concert at the New Barnet Pop Festival before leaving that band to join the Devil's Disciples in 1964. The band consisted of Banks on guitar, John Tite on vocals, Ray Alford on bass and Malcolm "Pinnie" Raye on drums. They recorded two songs on an acetate, Arthur Alexander's "You Better Move On" and Graham Gouldman's "For Your Love" which would be a hit record for the Yardbirds one year later. These two songs can be found on Banks' archival album Can I Play You Something. According to Chris Welch, The Devil's Disciples used to play the Rolling Stones' first album in its entirety, just for the sake of it. About a year later, Banks joined The Syndicats, replacing their guitarist Ray Fenwick, who himself had replaced Steve Howe, who would later replace Banks in Yes.

Banks then formed a new band with ex-the Selfs bassist Chris Squire, this band being the Syn. They were joined by keyboardist Andrew Pryce Jackman, Steve Nardelli on vocals as well as Gunnar Jökull Hákonarson on drums. They recorded two singles, "Created by Clive"/"Grounded" and "Flowerman"/"14 Hour Technicolour Dream" both in 1967 before calling it a day a year later. Squire meanwhile joined friends Clive Bayley (rhythm guitar) and Bob Hagger (drums) in Mabel Greer's Toyshop, and Banks came to join that band. He briefly left the band, which was subsequently joined by singer Jon Anderson and then drummer Bill Bruford replacing Hagger. During that short period of time, Banks played with the band Neat Change, recording one single, "I Lied to Aunty May" with Squire on tambourine and chorus. Banks then returned to Mabel Greer's Toyshop, and with the loss of Bayley and the addition of organist/pianist Tony Kaye, they started to write new music together, adding to a repertoire already including two songs already written, "Beyond and Before" by Squire and Bayley and "Sweetness" by Anderson, Bayley and Squire.

Career with Yes
The members searched for an appropriate name; Anderson suggested Life and Squire proposed World but all agreed on Banks' proposition of Yes. Atlantic Records took notice of the band and, in 1969, got them into a studio to record their first album, Yes. The next year another album was in progress (Time and a Word) but Anderson and Squire decided they wanted an orchestra backing the five musicians. The idea was not well received by Banks, and things got worse when the orchestral arrangements left the guitarist, as well as Tony Kaye, with little to do (strings replaced their parts almost note-for-note). Once the album was released, a tour ensued; Banks was asked to leave the group, playing his last concert with Yes on 18 April 1970 at The Luton College of Technology. He was replaced by Steve Howe. In his autobiography, Steve Howe wrote that Banks "was an interesting guitarist to have to follow. He, too, adopted different guitar styles and had already set a scene I could relate to. He was a sweet guy and came to many of our early gigs. I can't think of many other ex-band members doing that – I mean, right after they've left the band."

During Yes' 1991 Union tour, Kaye invited Banks to play during the encore at 15 May show at the Great Western Forum in Inglewood, California, United States. Banks accepted the invitation and went to the show, but says he was told by Kaye that Howe did not want him to play.

In August 1994, Banks was a featured guest at a Yes fan festival called Yestival. In 1995, he performed "Astral Traveller" on the Yes tribute album Tales from Yesterday. In 1997, he coordinated the release of a Yes compilation titled Something's Coming: The BBC Recordings 1969–1970. His liner notes described his early days with the band. Banks was also present at Yestival in July 1998. In 2006, he was interviewed for the Yes documentary Classic Artists: Yes. Several music videos featuring him with Yes during their early days can be seen in The Lost Broadcasts DVD released in 2009.

Work with other bands
After leaving Yes, and while looking for some other musical projects, Banks supported Blodwyn Pig for a brief period in late 1970, replacing their original guitarist Mick Abrahams. He guested as session musician on an album by Chris Harwood, Nice To Meet Miss Christine, with other musicians like Dave Lambert of The Strawbs on guitar, Tommy Eyre on keyboards, ex-King Crimson Ian McDonald on sax and flute as well as ex-Spencer Davis Group Pete York on percussion.

In 1971 Banks, singer Colin Carter, bassist Ray Bennett and drummer Mike Hough formed Flash and sessions began for a first album for Sovereign/Capitol Records, with Tony Kaye guesting on keyboards. The record appeared in 1972 (called simply Flash) and had a warm reception, with the single, "Small Beginnings" rising to #28 on the Billboard Charts. Subsequent to Kaye's involvement, Flash continued without a keyboardist. Flash recorded and released its second album (In the Can) in November that same year, with the singles "Lifetime" and "Children of the Universe" (from the first album) receiving significant airplay. A third album, Out of Our Hands was released in 1973. Due to on-going personal tensions within the band, including Banks meeting a new girlfriend, singer Sidonie Jordan, and wanting to form a band with her, Flash broke up while on tour in America in 1973.

Parallel to work on the third Flash album, Banks and guitarist Jan Akkerman became friends and started to play and record together. Banks also played on an album by Roger Ruskin Spear at that time. In 1973, simultaneous with the third and final Flash release, Capitol Records released Two Sides of Peter Banks. Guest musicians included Akkerman, bassist John Wetton, drummer Phil Collins, guitarist Steve Hackett and fellow Flash members Ray Bennett and Mike Hough.

Around the summer of 1973, Banks played with the jazz-rock band called Zox & the Radar Boys, including Phil Collins (drums) and his mate from the Flaming Youth days Ronnie Caryl on guitar, Mike Piggott (violin) and John Howitt (bass).

In 1973, Banks tried to form a new band, with singer and soon-to-be-wife, Sidney Foxx (real name Sidonie Jordan). Named Empire, Banks, Foxx, and various other band members recorded three albums up to 1979 which were unreleased. Phil Collins played drums on one track and Preston Heyman (later to join Kate Bush) played drums on the rest (after a recommendation from Collins), John Giblin from Brand X played bass, and Jakob Magnusson played organ on the first album, Mark I. Ray Bennett of Flash was asked to join the band and initially agreed, but due to continuing tensions, declined. Banks and Foxx divorced, although Empire remained together as a band for some time after.

Later work
Work in the second half of the 1970s included a number of session appearances, on separate albums by Lonnie Donegan and Jakob Frímann Magnússon. Banks made an appearance on Romeo Unchained, a 1986 album by Tonio K. He also worked with Ian Wallace in The Teabags, including Jackie Lomax on vocals and Kim Gardner on bass, the two played before with Tony Kaye's Badger, David Mansfield on guitar and Mel Collins on sax and flute. No recordings came out of that.

In 1993, Banks released Instinct, a solo album of instrumental tracks with him playing all the parts. Only a keyboard player, Gerald Goff, joined him for his next album, Self Contained (1995). In 1997, Banks was mainly responsible for the release of a double live Yes album, Something's Coming: The BBC Recordings 1969–1970  (renamed Beyond and Before in the US), a collection of appearances at the BBC during 1969 and 1970, featuring the original line-up in all tracks and with a booklet containing the guitarist's account of those early days.

Another archival release was Psychosync, a live Flash recording made in 1973 for the King Biscuit Flower Hour and finally released in 1998. Also, between 1995 and 1997 all three Empire albums were released (one per year). Banks also collaborated in 1995's Tales from Yesterday (a Yes tribute album) performing a version of the song "Astral Traveller" with Robert Berry; appeared on the album Big Beats in 1997; and played on 1999's Encores, Legends and Paradox, an Emerson, Lake & Palmer tribute album. He contributed to 1999's Come Together People of Funk by Funky Monkey (including keyboardist Gerard Johnson who helped on a number of Banks' projects in the 1990s and who also worked with Banks' old bandmate Chris Squire).

Those collaborations filled the gap in his own recording career, until 1999, when the album Reduction was issued. In 2000, Banks put out a collection of his oldest recordings (many previously unreleased) called Can I Play You Something?. The front sleeve of this last record showed an eight-year-old Banks posing with his first guitar. The track listing includes some early recordings by The Syn, Mabel Greer's Toyshop, and Yes, including an early rendition of the song "Beyond and Before".

A short track in the latter collection was called "Lima Loop". This is because Lima, Peru, became a special place for Banks in recent years. Cecilia Quino, a Peruvian girl who was a Yes fan, met and later wed Banks. They married in Lima, where the bride's parents lived. They later divorced.

Following an appearance by Banks and Geoff Downes together at the 1998 edition of Yestival (a Yes fan festival), the pair played some sessions and the possibility of Banks joining Asia was mooted. However, these sessions did not lead anywhere.

Banks appeared in small concerts by new young local bands, including the Yes tribute band Fragile. Later recorded appearances by Banks included Jabberwocky (2000) and Hound of the Baskervilles (2002), a pair of albums recorded by Oliver Wakeman (Rick Wakeman's son) and Clive Nolan. Rick Wakeman also narrates on the Jabberwocky album. Peter Banks also guested further on the Funky Monkey project.

Banks was initially involved in a reunion of The Syn in 2004 but left the band. After early talks in 2004, he was also not included in the current Flash reunion, which made their debut return at the Prog Day Festival 2010 with Flash bassist Ray Bennett taking over on lead guitar.

In late 2004, Banks formed a new improvising band, Harmony in Diversity, with Andrew Booker and Nick Cottam (who had been working together as duo Pulse Engine). They played a short UK tour in March 2006, and released an album called Trying. Booker left the band soon after. He was replaced by David Speight and the band continued to play further dates in the UK and Hungary in 2007. Banks was also planning a related project with keyboardist Gonzalo Carrera.

In Gibson Guitar's Lifestyle e-magazine of 3 February 2009, Banks is listed as one of the "10 Great Prog Rock Guitarists". According to the article, "Before there was Steve Howe, there was Peter Banks. Artistic differences between Banks and singer Jon Anderson prompted Banks's departure from Yes in 1970, but in his little-known '70s band, Flash, Banks used an ES-335 to create several should-have-been prog rock classics. "Lifetime", from Flash's In the Can album, is his tour-de-force."

Death
Banks died of heart failure on 7 March 2013 at his home in Barnet, London. He was reportedly found after failing to turn up for a scheduled recording session. He was 65.

Discography

With the Devil's Disciples
 1964: "You Better Move On"/"For Your Love" – Acetate

With the Syn

- Singles:
 1967: "Created by Clive" / "Grounded" – Deram 
 1967: "Flowerman" / "14 Hour Technicolour Dream" – Deram

- Album:
 2005: Original Syn: Complete History of The Syn 1967-1969

With Neat Change 
 1968: "I Lied to Aunty May" – Banks briefly played with that band, and they recorded a single with Chris Squire guesting on back vocals and tambourine

With Mabel Greer's Toyshop
 1968: "Images of You and Me" / "Beyond and Before" / "Electric Funeral" / "Get Yourself Together" and "Jeanetta" were included on Peter Banks' album Can I Play You Something?/The Roots of Yes

With Yes

- Studio albums:
 1969: Yes
 1970: Time and a Word

- Compilations :
 1974: Yesterdays (reissues from 1969 to 1970)
 1991: Yesyears (Yes boxed set including reissues)
 1997: Something's Coming: The BBC Recordings 1969–1970 (also known as Beyond and Before and Astral Traveller)

With Flash

 1972: Flash (EMI-Sovereign UK / Cleopatra Records US; reed. 1993 CEMA Special Markets, & 2009 Esoteric Recordings label + bonus track) Tony Kaye guests on keyboards : Hammond organ, piano and ARP Synthesizer 
 1972: In the Can (reed. 1993 CEMA & 2010 ER + bonus tracks)
 1973: Out of Our Hands (reed. 1993 CEMA & 2010 ER)
 1995: First three albums were edited on CD on One Way Records 
 1997: Psychosync (1973 – live WLIR radio broadcast, ed. Blueprint)
 2013: In Public featuring Peter Banks (Limited Edition Complete Live Concert 1973, AdequatEsounds)

With Empire
 1995: Mark I, recorded 1974, with Phil Collins on drums on (2 track) and John Giblin on bass 
 1995: Mark II, recorded 1977
 1996: Mark III, recorded 1978
 2014: The Mars Tapes, recorded 1979
 2017: The Complete Recordings

Solo
 1973: Two Sides of Peter Banks, with Phil Collins, Steve Hackett, John Wetton, Jan Akkerman, Ray Bennett and Mike Hough
 1994: Instinct
 1995: Self-Contained
 1997: Reduction
 1999: Can I Play You Something? (The Pre-Yes Years Recordings From 1964 to 1968), combining solo material with material by The Syn, The Devil's Disciples, Mabel Greer's Toyshop and Yes
 2018: The Self-Contained Trilogy, re-release of Instinct, Self-Contained and Reduction together
 2018: Be Well, Be Safe, Be Lucky... The Anthology, compilation including previously unreleased material

With Harmony in Diversity
 2006: Trying
 2018: The Complete Recordings

With David Cross
 2020: Crossover – With Tony Kaye, Billy Sherwood, Oliver Wakeman, Geoff Downes, Pat Mastelotto, etc.

Guest appearances
 1970: Nice to Meet Miss Christine, by Chris Harwood, with Dave Lambert (guitar), Tommy Eyre (keyboards), Ian MacDonald (saxophone & flute), Peter York (percussion)
 1971: Electric Shocks by Roger Ruskin Spear, with Peter Banks on two tracks ("Blue Baboon" and "Doctor Rock")
 1976: With Love by Pete Townshend – Plays on "All God's Mornings" with Sydney Foxx on vocals.
 1976: Guitar Workshop Volume Two (two solo tracks)
 1978: Puttin' on the Style, star tribute to Lonnie Donegan with Rory Gallagher, Elton John, Brian May & Ringo Starr
 1983: Can't Slow Down by Lionel Richie – guitar solo on "Hello" (uncredited)
 1995: Tales from Yesterday, Yes tribute album
 1997: Come Together People of Funk, by Funky Monkey
 1999: Jabberwocky, by Clive Nolan & Oliver Wakeman
 1999: Encore, Legends, & Paradox, by various artists (project headed by Robert Berry and Trent Gardner, with 10 covers of Emerson, Lake & Palmer, by 23 musicians including John Wetton and some time Yes members (Banks, Igor Khoroshev, Geoff Downes))
 2001: Marked for Madness, by Michelle Young
 2001: Angels & Ghosts, by Ray Bennett
 2002: The Hound of the Baskervilles, by Clive Nolan & Oliver Wakeman
 2002: Join Us in Tomorrow, by Funky Monkey
 2006: Return to the Dark Side of the Moon
 2011: Electronic Church Muzik, by Ant-Bee
 2011: Muso & Proud, by dB-Infusion
 2012: The Prog Collective, by The Prog Collective
 2012: Songs of the Century: An All-Star Tribute to Supertramp
 2012: Who Are You – An All-Star Tribute to The Who
 2013: In Extremis, by Days Between Stations
 2013: Epilogue, by The Prog Collective
 2018: Undercover, by Funky Monkey

References

External links
 Official website
 Official MySpace page
 Harmony in Diversity
 Yescography Peter Banks discography
 Where Are They Now? Peter Banks news
 Psychosync Peter Banks section
 Peter Banks – Interview on The Marquee Club
 Peter Banks biography, discography and album reviews, credits & releases at AllMusic
 Peter Banks discography, album releases & credits at Discogs
 Peter Banks biography, discography, album credits & user reviews at ProgArchives.com
 Peter Banks albums to be listened as stream on Spotify

1947 births
2013 deaths
British rock guitarists
Musicians from London
People from Chipping Barnet
Yes (band) members
Musicians from Hertfordshire
Lead guitarists
British male singers
British songwriters
British male guitarists
The Syn members